The 2018 Imus Bandera season is the 1st season of the franchise in the Maharlika Pilipinas Basketball League (MPBL).

Key dates
 January 25, 2018: Inaugural season of the Maharlika Pilipinas Basketball League (MPBL) starts.

Current roster

Anta Rajah Cup

Eliminations

Standings

Game log

|- style="background:#fcc;"
| 1
| January 30
| Bulacan
| L 79–93
| Chester Ian Melencio (13)
| John Patrick Rabe (10)
| Chester Ian Melencio (7)
| Bulacan Capitol Gymnasium
| 0–1

|- style="background:#fcc;"
| 2
| February 6
| Quezon City
| L 75–84
| Chester Ian Melencio (18)
| Rabe, Diwa (7)
| Jamil Sheriff (3)
| JCSGO Seed Dome
| 0–2
|- style="background:#fcc;"
| 3
| February 10
| Batangas
| L 56–74
| Chester Ian Melencio (23)
| John Patrick Rabe (8)
| Jamil Sheriff (4)
| Imus City Sports Complex
| 0–3
|- style="background:#fcc;"
| 4
| February 15
| Valenzuela
| L 77–81
| Orly Daroya (23)
| Orly Daroya (12)
| Jamil Sheriff (5)
| Olivares College Gymnasium
| 0–4
|- style="background:#fcc;"
| 5
| February 20
| Bataan
| L 87–91
| Elmer Mykiel Cabahug (20)
| Jonathan Rivera (10)
| Melencio, Sheriff (3)
| Muntinlupa Sports Complex
| 0–5
|- style="background:#cfc;"
| 6
| February 24
| Caloocan
| W 70–61
| Melencio, Daroya (13)
| Melencio, Cabahug (9)
| Jerome Ong (4)
| Bulacan Capitol Gymnasium
| 1–5

|- style="background:#cfc;"
| 7
| March 3
| Navotas
| W 70–67
| Orly Daroya (29)
| Jeffrey Tajonera (7)
| Chester Ian Melencio (3)
| Imus City Sports Complex
| 1–6
|- style="background:#fcc;"
| 8
| March 10
| Parañaque
| L 77–79
| Chester Ian Melencio (21)
| Jeffrey Tajonera (9)
| Chester Ian Melencio (6)
| Olivares College Gymnasium
| 2–6
|- style="background:#fcc;"
| 9
| March 17
| Muntinlupa
| L 69–81
| Chester Ian Melencio (19)
| Jessie Saitanan (9)
| Jamil Sheriff (3)
| Bulacan Capitol Gymnasium
| 2–7

Datu Cup

Standings

Game log

|- style="background:#fcc;"
| 1
| June 14
| Davao Occidental
| L 71–75
| Jeffrey Tajonera (13)
| Jomari Sollano (9)
| Manansala, Castro (3)
| Alonte Sports Arena
| 0–1
|- style="background:#fcc;"
| 2
| June 23
| General Santos
| L 73–79
| Paolo Pontejos (20)
| Chester Ian Melencio (9)
| Paolo Pontejos (6)
| Imus City Sports Complex
| 0–2

|- style="background:#bfb;"
| 3
| July 4
| Marikina
| W 72–71
| Mark Anthony Guillen (20)
| Mark Anthony Guillen (8)
| Pontejos, Melencio (2)
| Marist School Gymnasium
| 1–2
|- style="background:#d3d3d3;"
| 
| July 17
| Quezon City
| colspan=6| Postponed (Inclement weather) 
|- style="background:#bfb;"
| 4
| July 28
| Bataan
| L 85–95
| Orly Daroya (18)
| Orly Daroya (8)
| Dan Irvin Alberto (3)
| Navotas Sports Complex
| 1–3

Transactions

Free–Agency

Additions

Subtraction

References

Imus Bandera
Imus Bandera Season, 2018